This is a list of monuments in Tolyatti, a city in the Samara province of Russia. Many of the entries on this list are officially protected by having formal status as monuments, but not all – some are just monuments in the generic sense of being memorials, or artwork of monumental size.

The modern history of Tolyatti only begins in the mid 1950s. Before that, the city – then called Stavropol-on-Don – was located where the Kuybyshev Reservoir now stands; it was moved to its present location before the filling of the reservoir, so there is little architecture from before then, although a few small buildings were preserved from the old Stavropol by being moved.

The main document regulating the list of monuments and their use and protection has long been a 2000 decree from the Tolyatti City Council.

By this decree, Tolyatti monuments are divided into five categories: historical monuments, architectural monuments, monumental art, memorials, and documentary monuments (that is, historical documents), and into three classes: monuments of national significance, monuments of regional significance, and monuments of local significance. The only monuments of national significance in Tolyatti are documents, which are stored at City Hall.

New monuments were to be added to the roster after assessment by experts from the Tolyatti Museum of Local History followed by a resolution from the City Council. However, the registry did not increase by a single monument after its creation, and in December 2011 the decree was revoked.

In early 2013, the Tolyatti city government released a report on the work done in Tolyatti for the conservation, use, and promotion of objects of cultural heritage and work of monumental and decorative art. This report included a suggestion for a new, substantially modified list of monuments. However,  no legislation has been passed on the municipal level to implement this, although a number of monuments are protected under the aegis of the Samara provincial government.

In 2013, the Tolyatti Museum of Local History, which the City has entrusted with the promotion of cultural heritage, published lists of the cultural and historical objects of regional importance located within the city of Tolyatti, as well of monumental sites and plaques maintained by the City of Tolyatti. The Museum classifies cultural heritage sites into three types: monuments, groups of entities (such as groups of buildings), and places of interest.

(There are also two lists of objects of cultural heritage in the territory of Tolyatti created by the Samara provincial government. These are actually a list of objects which  contains only two entries, and a list of identified cultural heritage objects, that is objects which have received approval as such in expert opinion but which do not yet have protected status, which status may be granted later or refused.)

This list uses the classes provided by the Tolyatti Museum of Local History.

References
 

Monuments and memorials in Tolyatti
Tolyatti